Artur Khachaturyan (born 4 August 1992) is an Armenian professional basketball player, currently a free agent.

He represented Armenia's national basketball team at the 2016 FIBA European Championship for Small Countries in Ciorescu, Moldova, where he was his team's 2nd best scorer.

References

External links
 FIBA profile
 FIBA Archive profile
 Eurobasket.com profile

1992 births
Armenian men's basketball players
Ukrainian people of Armenian descent
Living people
Small forwards